The 2007 Michigan Wolverines football team represented the University of Michigan in the 2007 NCAA Division I FBS football season. This was Lloyd Carr's final season as Michigan head coach. The 2007 season began with a stunning loss to Appalachian State, but the Wolverines won eight straight games after starting 0–2 and finished 9–4 with a win over No. 9 Florida in the Capital One Bowl, 41–35. Michigan finished tied for second in the Big Ten Conference with Illinois, a team the Wolverines defeated 27–17 in Champaign.

Preseason
After finishing 2006 11–2 and in contention for the national championship game, many were expecting the Wolverines to build on their success, earning a national preseason ranking of No. 5.

On March 25, Coach Lloyd Carr announced that TE Carson Butler, DE Eugene Germany, and DB Chris Richards had been dismissed for violations of team policy.

Carr also had stated that WR Adrian Arrington had been suspended for the spring practice session due to a violation of team policy. Carr was uncertain about Arrington's future at Michigan but Arrington did play WR at Michigan for the 2007 season.

Backup QB Jason Forcier asked to be released from his scholarship to transfer to Stanford University, and LB Cobrani Mixon was released from his scholarship to transfer to Kent State University.

Schedule
The 2007 Wolverine schedule was ranked the 15th toughest in the country. The home schedule was ranked as the 5th toughest.

Radio coverage for all games was on the Michigan Sports Network, as well as on Sirius Satellite Radio.

Game summaries

Appalachian State

In the 34–32 loss, Michigan became the second team ever ranked in the AP Top 25 to lose to a Division I FCS team. Michigan started out strong, finishing the first quarter 14–7, but the Mountaineers scored 21 unanswered points to go up 28–14 just before halftime. After trailing 28–14 in the first half, Michigan recaptured a 32–31 lead thanks to three Appalachian State turnovers and a 54-yard touchdown run by senior running back Mike Hart with 4:36 left in the game.

However, after the teams traded possessions, the Mountaineers drove 69 yards in 11 plays, and Julian Rauch connected on a 24-yard field goal with 26 seconds remaining in the contest to give ASU a 34–32 lead. After a failed pass attempt, Chad Henne connected with Mario Manningham on a Hail Mary Pass with under 15 seconds left to get Michigan to the 20-yard line.  Michigan had a 37-yard field goal to give Michigan what looked like to be their escape from the upset.  Then, shocking the College Football world, Appalachian State's Corey Lynch blocked the kick with 6 seconds left to seal the huge upset. The attendance for the game was 109,218. Following the game, Michigan dropped out of the Top 25 in the next poll. This was first time in the history of the AP Poll that a team ranked in the Top 5 had fallen out of the poll as a result of a single game.

Oregon

    
    
    
    
    
    
    

Michigan looked to recover from their stunning loss to App State in their next game against Oregon. Michigan took a 7–3 lead in the first quarter, but then Dennis Dixon and the high-powered Oregon offense went to town on the struggling Wolverines defense, giving Michigan one of its worst home losses on record. The Michigan fans booed the Wolverines on their home field and people were calling for Head Coach Lloyd Carr to be fired. The loss was another embarrassment to the football program at the University of Michigan. In addition to the huge defeat, Michigan lost its senior QB Chad Henne to a knee injury for two games due to a play in the second quarter.  ESPN reported, "A week after getting stunned by Appalachian State, the Wolverines were handed their worst beating since before Bo Schembechler worked the sideline at the Big House.  Dennis Dixon accounted for 368 yards and a career-high four touchdowns, helping the Ducks build a 25-point lead at halftime and cruise to an easy victory."  The 32-point defeat was Michigan's worst loss since losing 50–14 at Ohio State in 1968 and their second-worst home loss ever, dating back to a 40-0 loss to Minnesota in 1935. The Wolverines started 0–2 for the first time since 1998 and the first time starting 0–2 on a homestead since 1959 but in a positive note, both those times Michigan rebounded back and won the Big Ten title."

Notre Dame

    
    
    
    
    
    

The Wolverines and The Fighting Irish met for the first time with both teams boasting an 0–2 record. Since both teams lost their final two games of the 2006 season, the loser of this game would have a five-game losing streak.  Lloyd Carr faced many challenges, including the loss of his senior quarterback Chad Henne to a leg injury, fans calling for his firing, and his senior running back Mike Hart guaranteed a victory over the Irish.

Michigan won 38–0, tying their largest-ever win over Notre Dame set during the 2003 season.  For only the second time in school history, Notre Dame opened the season with three losses.

Penn State

In the 2007 Big Ten season opener, the unranked Michigan Wolverines defeated No. 10 Penn State 14–9.
Sr. running back Mike Hart had 44 carries 153 yards and a TD. In his second start freshmen QB Ryan Mallett was 16–29 passes and a rushing TD.

Northwestern

The Michigan football team went on the first road game of the season defeating the Wildcats 28–16. Henne returned to the lineup to complete 18–27 passes and three touchdowns. Mike Hart had 106 yards and a TD. The Wolverines forced a turnover on the last 4 of the Wildcat possessions.

Eastern Michigan

Purdue

Illinois

Minnesota

Despite a slow start and two early turnovers, the Wolverines extended their win streak to seven without Chad Henne or Mike Hart. After a Minnesota field goal, Minnesota's Dominique Barber recovered one of Ryan Mallett's three fumbles and returned it for a touchdown. Despite that, the Wolverines held the Gophers to just 231 yards and 3 offensive points all game. Michigan's Brandon Minor and Carlos Brown both ran for over 100 yards, meaning up until this game Michigan has had a back go over 100 yards in every match up. Mario Manningham had his fourth straight 100+ yard game.

Michigan State

Led by Chad Henne's four touchdown passes, Michigan rallied to defeat Michigan State 28–24. Down 24-14 in the fourth quarter, Michigan began an 80-yard drive which was later capped by Henne's third touchdown pass, this time to Adrian Arrington.  After Michigan's defense forced a 3-and-out, their offense went back to work.  In Michigan State territory facing a 3rd and 12, Henne found Mario Manningham in the endzone, giving Michigan a 28–24 lead. Michigan State's final drive stalled after QB Brian Hoyer's 4th-and-18 pass fell incomplete.  Henne took a knee to run out the clock and seal the victory.

Wisconsin

Ohio State

Florida

    
    
    
    
    
    
    
    
    
    
    
    

Chad Henne and Adrian Arrington set single-game career highs for passing and receiving yards, with 373 and 153, respectively, to lead the Wolverines to a 41–35 victory over the 12th-ranked Gators. The Wolverine defense managed to contain Heisman Trophy winning quarterback Tim Tebow with constant pressure and blitzing for most of the game, holding him to 154 passing yards and 57 rushing yards. Tebow did score 4 touchdowns however. The Wolverines overcame 4 turnovers, including 2 fumbles by Mike Hart, and a late 35–31 deficit to win their first bowl game in 4 seasons and the final game of Lloyd Carr's career.

Statistical achievements
Mike Hart set the following school rushing records: career carries (1015), eclipsing Anthony Thomas' seven-year-old record of 924 and still standing; career yards (5040), also eclipsing Thomas' seven-year-old record of 4472 and still standing; career yards per game (117.2), surpassing Billy Taylor's 102.4 set in 1971 and still standing; career 100-yard games (28), passing Thomas' 22 set in 2000 and still standing; career 150-yard games (12), surpassing Thomas' 9 set in 2000 and still standing; career 200-yard games (5), extending his own record set in 2005 and still standing.  Mario Manningham established the school record for consecutive 100-yard reception games with six, surpassing Braylon Edwards' record of 4. Chad Henne broke several of John Navarre's career records established in 2003: attempts (1387), completions (828), yards (9715), touchdown passes (87), and 150-yard passing games (38).  Henne also broke Rick Leach's career record for interceptions of 35 set in 1978 with 37.

Players

Depth chart

2007 Projected Starters

OFFENSE:

 QB –  Chad Henne – SR
 HB –  Mike Hart – SR
 FB – Tim North – JR
 WR1 – Mario Manningham – JR
 WR2 – Adrian Arrington – JR
 TE – Mike Massey– JR
 RT – Steve Schilling – FR
 RG – Alex Mitchell – JR
 C – Justin Boren – FR
 LG – Adam Kraus – SR
 LT – Jake Long – SR

DEFENSE:
 DE – Tim Jamison – JR
 DT – Will Johnson – JR
 NT – Terrance Taylor – JR
 DE – Brandon Graham – SO
 OLB – Shawn Crable – SR
 MLB – Obi Ezeh – SO
 OLB – Chris Graham – SR
 CB – Morgan Trent – JR
 CB – Donovan Warren – FR
 SS – Jamar Adams – SR
 FS – Michael Williams – FR

SPECIAL TEAMS:
 K – K.C. Lopata – JR
 P – Zoltan Mesko – SO
 PR – Greg Mathews – SO
 KR – Brandon Minor – SO

Key Committed Freshman

1. Ryan Mallett – QB
2. Avery Horn – RB
3. Vince Helmuth – FB
4. Toney Clemons – WR
5. Junior Hemingway – WR
6. Zion Babb – WR
7. Martell Webb – TE
8. David Molk – C
9. Ryan Van Bergen – DE
10. Renaldo Sagesse – DT
11. Austin Panter – MLB
12. Brandon Herron – SLB
13. Marell Evans – WLB
14. Michael Williams – S
15. James Rogers – S
16. Donovan Warren – CB
17. Troy Woolfolk – CB

Roster

Awards
Jamar Adams – Bednarik Award watchlist, Jim Thorpe Award watchlist, Lott Trophy watchlist
Shawn Crable – Bednarik Award semifinalist, Butkus Award semifinalist, Bronko Nagurski Trophy watchlist, Lott Trophy watchlist
Mike Hart – Maxwell Award semifinalist, Walter Camp Award watchlist, Doak Walker Award watchlist
Chad Henne – Walter Camp Award watchlist, Maxwell Award watchlist, Manning Award watchlist, Davey O'Brien Award watchlist
Adam Kraus – Outland Trophy watchlist
Jake Long – Lombardi Award finalist, Outland Trophy watchlist
Mario Manningham – Walter Camp Award watchlist, Maxwell Award watchlist
Zoltan Mesko – Ray Guy Award watchlist

Coaching staff
 Lloyd Carr – Head Coach – 28 years at U-M (13 years as head coach)
 Mike DeBord – Offensive coordinator/tight ends – 12 years
 Ron English – Defensive coordinator/safeties – 5 years
 Erik Campbell – Wide receivers/Assistant head coach – 13 years
 Fred Jackson – Running backs/associate head coach – 16 years
 Scot Loeffler – Quarterbacks – 6 years
 Andy Moeller – Offensive line – 8 years
 Steve Stripling – Defensive line – 3 years
 Steve Szabo – Linebackers – 2 years
 Vance Bedford – Secondary – 1 year

References

External links
 2007 Football Team – Bentley Historical Library, University of Michigan Athletics History
 2007 Michigan at NCAA.org
 2007 statistics at ESPN.com

Michigan
Michigan Wolverines football seasons
Citrus Bowl champion seasons
Michigan Wolverines football